Owen Brown (February 16, 1771 – May 8, 1856), father of abolitionist John Brown, was a wealthy cattle breeder and land speculator who operated a successful tannery in Hudson, Ohio. He was also a fervent abolitionist and civil servant, shout and outspoken. Brown was a founder of multiple institutions including the Western Reserve Anti-Slavery Society, Western Reserve College, and the Free Congressional Church. Brown gave speeches advocating the immediate abolition of slavery and facilitated the Underground Railroad.His brother Frederick was the father of Rev Edward Brown   who married Laura Ingalls and Almanzo Wilder and adopted Laura's good friend Ida Brown (birth name Wright).

Someone whose father was an intimate friend of Owen remembered him as "a very kind, genial, whole-souled sort of person. He stuttered badly."

Owen wrote two brief autobiographic statements that have survived to the present.

Early life and education
One of 10 children, Owen Brown was born on February 16, 1771, to Revolutionary War Capt. John Brown (1728–1776) and Hanna Owen Brown, in Torrington, Connecticut. A lifetime admirer of the Founding Fathers, Owen's first memory was of the departure of his father's militia company to engage the British in New York during the summer of 1776.

Career
A wealthy tanner, cattle breeder, and land speculator, Brown was a dedicated civil servant and was integral to the early growth of Hudson, Ohio. Famed for his resourcefulness and energy, he was known locally as Squire Brown. He was the third wealthiest man in Hudson in the 1830s. Brown served in a multitude of positions in the community including County Commissioner and Justice of the Peace. Brown was deeply rooted in the abolitionist movement. He was personal friends with leaders such as Frederick Douglass, who often stayed with the Brown family when he was lecturing in the area. Owen, in collaboration with David Hudson, was integral in establishing one of the earliest way stations along the Underground Railroad, and personally arranged passage into Canada for many escaped slaves.

Colleges
Owen was a founding trustee of Western Reserve College and is credited for securing its location in Hudson as well as overseeing the construction of its first building. During Brown's tenure (1825-1835), Western Reserve College became known as a hotbed of abolitionist ideals. After the death of the institution's first president, Charles Backus Storrs, in 1833 the university elected a more conservative president, George E. Pierce, in an attempt to distance itself from the politics of slavery. In 1835 Brown resigned his position and joined a large contingency of faculty, staff, and students of Western Reserve College, who, together with one trustee, one professor, and a large number of students from Lane Theological Seminary in Cincinnati, in moving to Oberlin Collegiate Institute (since 1850, Oberlin College) in Oberlin, Ohio, where Owen served as trustee from 1835 to 1844. Brown and others were successful in making Oberlin the first institution of higher learning to admit women and one of the first to admit black students. Owen's own daughter, Florella Brown, studied at Oberlin from 1835 to 1839, where she met her husband, Samuel Lyle Adair.

Death and burial
Brown died in Hudson, Ohio on May 8, 1856 and was buried at Old Hudson Township Burying Ground. His death in Hudson was a "public event": "there was never so large a funeral procession."

See also
Abolitionism
Underground Railroad

References

Bibliography
 Carlton, Evan (2006). Patriotic Treason: John Brown and the Soul of America. New York, NY: Free Press. .
 Cutler, Carroll (1876). "A History of Western Reserve College During its First Half Century 1826-1876". Cleveland, OH: Crocker's Publishing House.
 Du Bois, W.E.B.(1972). "John Brown". New York, NY: International Publishers. .

External links

 Owen and Ruth Brown, from the West Virginia Archives and History

1771 births
1856 deaths
University and college founders
Case Western Reserve University people
People from Torrington, Connecticut
Family of John Brown (abolitionist)
People from Hudson, Ohio
Underground Railroad people
People of colonial Connecticut
Burials in Ohio